Ten Violent Women is a 1982 American film directed by Ted V. Mikels.

It led to a sequel in 2015.

Production
The film was made in 1979. Mikels said:
It had been a couple of years since I had made a film, ‘Well let’s put one together, even if we can’t’ James Gordon White, a good writer, had written a thing called The Violent Sex, it was only a prison thing. I decided to make a story that has some action, and there’s a reason for the girls to go to prison. This thing about the girls using water pistols to rob jewelry stores and it led to a bit of difficulty there. And I took a big part. They said if everybody is going to take a part then I had to take one too.
Mikels made the film for only $145,000. He shot on existing locations including a disused Los Angeles, and used some of his polygamous "wives" at the time as eight of the ten violent women.

References

External links

Ten Violent Women at TCMDB
Ten Violent Women at Letterbox DVD

1982 films
American action thriller films
Films directed by Ted V. Mikels
1980s American films